C. Welborn Daniel (June 12, 1926 – August 10, 2016) was an American attorney, politician and judge in Lake County, Florida.

Daniel was born on June 12, 1926, in Okeechobee, Florida. He attended the University of Florida, where he was a member of the Phi Kappa Tau fraternity. In 1950, he earned an LL.B. from the university. He was named to the Florida bar in 1950. Upon graduation he returned to Lake County to practice law and where he continued to reside until his death. He also served in World War II with the United States Navy. He served in the Florida House of Representatives for Lake County from 1956 to 1964, as a Democrat. He was elected to the State Senate for the 23rd district in 1963 and served until 1966. He was once again elected to the State Senate in 1968, this time for district 15; he would serve until 1971. Starting in 1977 he served as a judge of the Florida 5th Circuit court in Tavares and then as a judge of the Florida 5th District Courts of Appeal in Daytona. Daniel died on August 10, 2016.

References

1926 births
2016 deaths
People from Okeechobee, Florida
Fredric G. Levin College of Law alumni
Florida lawyers
Judges of the Florida District Courts of Appeal
Democratic Party members of the Florida House of Representatives
Democratic Party Florida state senators
People from Leesburg, Florida
20th-century American judges
20th-century American lawyers